Olavo Cecco Rigon Airport  is the airport serving Concórdia, Brazil.

History
The runway sits atop a ridge with dropoffs on all sides. The terrain in all quadrants is hilly, with ridges and ravines.

The airport underwent major renovation work in 2013.

Airlines and destinations
No scheduled flights operate at this airport.

Accidents and incidents
6 September 1961: Real Transportes Aéreos, a Douglas C-47-DL registration PP-AVL belonging to Aerovias Brasil, while on visual approach under adverse conditions to Concórdia crashed into a hill 1,500m short of the runway. Three crew members died.

Access

See also

List of airports in Brazil

References

External links

Airports in Santa Catarina (state)